The 1969 Australia rugby union tour of South Africa  was a series played by the Australia national rugby union team between June and September 1969.
The "Wallabies " lost the series with Springboks by four tests to nil.

The Matches (not complete)
Scores and results list Australia's points tally first.

Squad leadership
The Wallaby squad was captained by Greg Davis  described by Howell as "a leader of men who believed a leader should lead....a single minded flanker who gave no quarter and asked for none". Davis was making his fifth overseas tour with the Wallabies but his first as captain.The former Wallaby and All Black Des Connor was the coach with the traditional title of "Assistant Manager".

References

Australia national rugby union team tours
1969
tour
tour